Cicindela cyanea is a species of tiger beetle in the genus Cicindela. It was discovered by Fabricus in 1787.

See also
 List of Cicindela species

References

Beetles described in 1787
cyanea